Al-Gharbi is a sub-district located in Qaflat Othor District, 'Amran Governorate, Yemen. Al-Gharbi had a population of 10325 according to the 2004 census.

References 

Sub-districts in Qaflat Othor District